Richard Sterling (born in Sebastopol, California, 3 April 1953) is a travel, food and lifestyle journalist, as well as one of the foremost practitioners of the "literature of gusto". Originally from Northern California, he spent many years as a sailor, an engineer, and a diarist before becoming a journalist.

Early life
Sterling is of mixed British and German ancestry. He spent his childhood in the forested areas of Northern California where his family made a living in the timber industry. After the timber industry collapsed the family moved in several places in California. At age 18 he graduated at Vallejo High School. After a brief experience as lumberjack and quarryman he joined the U.S. Navy, where he spent seven years, mainly in South East Asia.

Literary career
He is a pioneer of culinary literature in English. He was encouraged in this by correspondence with the writer M. F. K. Fisher, to whom he dedicated his first book, Dining with Headhunters:Jungle Feasts and Other Culinary Adventures. The author of more than a dozen books, Sterling has been honored by the James Beard Foundation for his food writing, and he holds the Lowell Thomas Award and the ForeWord Award for travel literature. The New York Times book page dubbed him "Indiana Jones of Gastronomy" for his willingness to "go anywhere and court any danger" for the sake of a good meal and a good story. He is also the principal author of Lonely Planet's award-winning World Food series. He has appeared many times on TV and radio in USA, Europe, Australia, and Vietnam.

He resides in Cambodia. Prior to that he lived and wrote in Vietnam, where his food and drink column "Sterling's Saigon" appeared monthly in Asia Life magazine for 48 months.

Selected bibliography

External links
  Personal website

Living people
American columnists
American food writers
American travel writers
American male non-fiction writers
Writers from California
1953 births